Robert Lach (1901–1971) was an Austrian cinematographer.

Selected filmography
 Joyless Street (1925)
 Secrets of a Soul (1926)
 Unmarried Daughters (1926)
 Sex in Chains (1928)
 The Insurmountable (1928)
 The Woman in the Advocate's Gown (1929)
 Tragedy of Youth (1929)
 The Right of the Unborn (1929)
 Somnambul (1929)
 Eros in Chains (1929)
 Three Days Confined to Barracks (1930)
 Poor as a Church Mouse (1931)
 Weekend in Paradise (1931)
 A Thousand for One Night (1933)

References

Bibliography
 Kreimeier, Klaus. The Ufa story: a history of Germany's greatest film company, 1918–1945. University of California Press, 1999.

External links

1901 births
1971 deaths
Austrian cinematographers
Film people from Vienna